Le Gardeur station was on Saint-Paul Street in the Le Gardeur district of Repentigny, Quebec, Canada.

The station was marked only by a signpost and was a request stop for two Via Rail routes from Montreal, Quebec. Via Rail announced that as of August 7, 2015, and "for safety reasons related to the railway crossing", all trains serving the two routes would no longer stop there, effectively shutting down the station. Passengers were directed to use L'Assomption railway station.

References

External links

Via Rail stations in Quebec
Railway stations in Lanaudière
Transport in Repentigny, Quebec